Charlie Clausen (born 31 July 1977) is an Australian actor most known for his role as Jake Harrison on McLeod's Daughters in 2003 and as Acting Sergeant Alex Kirby on the police drama series Blue Heelers, which he starred in for the majority of Season 12 (2005) and Season 13 (2006). In 2012 he joined the cast of Home and Away as Zac MacGuire. Clausen left Home and Away in May 2017 after four years.

Personal life
Clausen married his partner of 12 years Gemma Lee in Los Angeles on 23 September 2015. Their first child, a daughter, was born in September 2019.

Clausen is a known supporter of the St Kilda Football Club in the AFL.

Podcast
From July 2010 to September 2012, Clausen collaborated on a free weekly podcast, TOFOP (aka 30 Odd Foot of Pod), with comedian Wil Anderson. TOFOP was placed on indefinite hiatus when Clausen began filming on Home and Away as the Seven Network deemed it a conflict of interest. Anderson then started another similar podcast called FOFOP (as in "faux TOFOP"), with various comedians and personalities featured as "Guest Charlies". Anderson and Clausen reunited for a live show as part of the 2014 Melbourne Comedy Festival, co-starring several Guest Charlies. This special podcast may be released when Clausen is no longer starring on Home and Away. On 1 June 2014, Clausen returned to the podcast.

In February 2015, Clausen launched his own solo podcast That's Aweson, the title referring to an episode of TOFOP in which Clausen tried to convince Anderson that his surname rhymed with "awesome."

In 2015, Clausen and Anderson launched an AFL themed podcast 2 Guys 1 Cup. The name referring to the fact that Clausen's St Kilda Football Club and Anderson's Western Bulldogs had one combined AFL/VFL premiership. The opening song of the podcast to the tune of the Hawthorn Football Club's, "We're a happy team at Hawthorn", which features witty lyrics about the common failures of their teams to secure finals football. When Anderson's Western Bulldogs won the 2016 AFL Grand Final, in the following seasons the lyric, "Two cups in one hundred years" was followed with the pair making comment on the redundancy of the lyric. Common asides of the podcast is the pair going off on non-football related tangents or having to admit they watched only one or two games of the competition's nine weekly games. Most recently, they have explored the dynamics of the fictional relationship between two of the games best midfielders, Nat Fyfe and Ben Cunnington.

Filmography

References

External links
 TOFOP Podcast
 

Australian male soap opera actors
Living people
Male actors from Melbourne
1977 births
People educated at Xavier College